TCDD DH 7000 are a type of diesel-hydraulic locomotive built for operations on Turkish State Railways by Tülomsaş. The DH7000 was primarily used as a shunter. A total of 20 units were delivered from 1994.

External links
 Tülomsaş page on DH7000
 Trains of Turkey page on DH7000

Tülomsaş locomotives
C locomotives
DH07000
Standard gauge locomotives of Turkey
Railway locomotives introduced in 1994